There has been a Lord Lieutenant of Buckinghamshire almost continuously since the position was created by King Henry VIII in 1535.  The only exception to this was the English Civil War and English Interregnum between 1643 and 1660 when there was no king to support the Lieutenancy.  The following list consists of all known holders of the position: earlier records (prior to 1607) have been lost and so a complete list is not possible. Since 1702, all Lord Lieutenants have also been Custos Rotulorum of Buckinghamshire.

Charles Brandon, 1st Duke of Suffolk 1545 (died 22 August 1545)
Unknown period 1545 – 1551
Edward Seymour, 1st Duke of Somerset 10 May 1551 – beheaded 22 January 1552
Francis Russell, 2nd Earl of Bedford 1552
William Parr, 1st Marquess of Northampton 1553 (attainted 1553)
Unknown period 1553 – 1559
Thomas Howard, 4th Duke of Norfolk 1559
Unknown period 1559 – 1569
Arthur Grey, 14th Baron Grey de Wilton 1569
Unknown period 1569 – 1586
Arthur Grey, 14th Baron Grey de Wilton 12 September 1586 – 14 October 1593
Unknown period 1593 – 1607
Thomas Egerton, 1st Baron Ellesmere 22 December 1607 – 15 September 1616
George Villiers, 1st Duke of Buckingham 16 September 1616 – assassinated 23 August 1628
Philip Herbert, 4th Earl of Pembroke 28 September 1628 – 1641
Robert Dormer, 1st Earl of Carnarvon 2 June 1641 – 1643 (Royalist Lieutenant)
William Paget, 5th Baron Paget 1641 – May 1642 (Parliamentarian Lieutenant)
Philip Wharton, 4th Baron Wharton 1642 (Parliamentarian Lieutenant)
No Lord Lieutenant in place during English Civil War and English Interregnum
John Egerton, 2nd Earl of Bridgewater 23 July 1660 – 26 October 1686
John Egerton, 3rd Earl of Bridgewater 26 November 1686 – 1687
George Jeffreys, 1st Baron Jeffreys 12 November 1687 – 1689
John Egerton, 3rd Earl of Bridgewater 4 April 1689 – 19 March 1701
Thomas Wharton, 5th Baron Wharton 23 January 1702 – 1702
William Cheyne, 2nd Viscount Newhaven 18 June 1702 – 1702
Scroop Egerton, 4th Earl of Bridgewater 14 January 1703 – 1711
Henry Grey, 1st Duke of Kent 1711 – 1712
William Cheyne, 2nd Viscount Newhaven 22 May 1712 – 1714
Scroop Egerton, 1st Duke of Bridgewater 8 December 1714 – 1728
Richard Temple, 1st Viscount Cobham 23 February 1728 – 1738
Charles Spencer, 3rd Duke of Marlborough 26 January 1739 – 20 October 1758
Richard Grenville-Temple, 2nd Earl Temple 15 January 1759 – 1763
Francis Dashwood, 11th Baron le Despencer 16 May 1763 – 11 December 1781
Philip Stanhope, 5th Earl of Chesterfield 5 January 1782 – 1782
George Nugent-Temple-Grenville, 1st Marquess of Buckingham 8 April 1782 – 11 February 1813
Richard Temple-Nugent-Brydges-Chandos-Grenville, 1st Duke of Buckingham and Chandos 9 March 1813 – 17 January 1839
Robert Carrington, 2nd Baron Carrington 1 February 1839 – 17 March 1868
Richard Temple-Nugent-Brydges-Chandos-Grenville, 3rd Duke of Buckingham and Chandos 23 July 1868 – 26 March 1889
Nathan Mayer Rothschild, 1st Baron Rothschild 20 May 1889 – 31 March 1915
Charles Wynn-Carington, 1st Marquess of Lincolnshire 10 May 1915 – 1923
Thomas Fremantle, 3rd Baron Cottesloe 10 July 1923 – 1954
Sir Henry Aubrey-Fletcher, 6th Baronet 28 June 1954 – 1961
Sir Henry Floyd, 5th Baronet 27 July 1961 – 5 November 1968
John Darling Young 9 May 1969 – 1984
John Fremantle, 5th Baron Cottesloe 1984–1997
Sir Nigel Mobbs 1997 – 21 October 2005
Sir Henry Aubrey-Fletcher, 8th Baronet 2006–June 2020
The Countess Howe DL 26 June 2020

Deputy lieutenants
A deputy lieutenant of Buckinghamshire is commissioned by the Lord Lieutenant of Buckinghamshire. Deputy lieutenants support the work of the lord-lieutenant. There can be several deputy lieutenants at any time, depending on the population of the county. Their appointment does not terminate with the changing of the lord-lieutenant, but they usually retire at age 75.

19th Century
31 October 1846: William Jenney, Esq.
31 October 1846: John Kay, Esq.
31 October 1846: Henry Thomas Worley, Esq.
31 October 1846: William Capel Clayton, Esq.

20th Century
5 January 1900: Sir Robert Grenville Harvey,

See also
 High Sheriff of Buckinghamshire

References

Sources

External links
Lord-Lieutenant for Buckinghamshire

 
Buckinghamshire
Local government in Buckinghamshire